Cycling is one of the sports at the quadrennial Commonwealth Games competition. It has been a Commonwealth Games sport since the second edition of the event's precursor, the 1934 British Empire Games. It is an optional sport and may, or may not, be included in the sporting programme of each edition of the Games, but has appeared in every edition of the Games to date. Australia have been the most successful nation in the event by a significant margin, with England and New Zealand closely matched for second place. Australia have led the medal table 16 times, one of which was shared by Canada, including every edition of the Games since 1990. England have led the table four times, but not since 1974. New Zealand have topped the table once, in their home Games of 1990..

Editions

Events

Track cycling events

Road cycling events

Mountain biking events

Para-track

All-time medal table

Updated after the 2022 Commonwealth Games

Para-track Cycling All-time medal table

Updated after the 2022 Commonwealth Games

Mountain Bike All-time medal table

Updated after the 2022 Commonwealth Games

External links
Commonwealth Games sport index

 
Sports at the Commonwealth Games
Commonwealth Games